Yoo Yeon-jung (born August 3, 1999), known mononymously as Yeonjung, is a South Korean singer signed under Starship Entertainment and Yuehua Entertainment. She is best known for being a member of the South Korean-Chinese girl group WJSN, and for finishing 11th in the survival show Produce 101, making her a member of I.O.I.

Early life and education
Yoo was born on August 3, 1999, in Gwangmyeong, Gyeonggi Province, South Korea. In 2017, Yoo was accepted through rolling admission into the musical theatre program of the Performance & Film Department at Dankook University.

Career

2016: Produce 101 and I.O.I

Yoo, together with Kim Tae-ha and Shim Chae-eun represented Starship Entertainment in the Mnet reality-survival program Produce 101, which aimed to form an eleven-member girl group that would promote for a year under YMC Entertainment. Yoo placed 11th with a total of 136,780 votes in the final episode and debuted as a member of I.O.I.

On May 4, project girl group I.O.I debuted with the mini-album Chrysalis.

2016–present: WJSN, V-1 and solo activities

While still an active member of I.O.I, Yoo was introduced as the thirteenth member of WJSN on July 11. Yoo made her official debut with WJSN on August 17, 2016. They released their second mini album The Secret with all 13 members. Yoo collaborated with Yoo Seung-woo on the track "I Will Be On Your Side" which was released on November 10, 2016. Yoo, together with bandmate Dawon, released the track "Fire & Ice" as part of The Snow Queen 3: Fire and Ice OST. The track was released on December 16, 2016. On May 31, 2017, Yoo released the soundtrack "You're Dazzling" for the television series Queen for Seven Days. Yoo collaborated with Brother Su and participated in the soundtrack of Love Playlist 2 with the track "Toy". She was featured in DinDin's "#Drive". "Meloholic" was released for the OCN drama Meloholic. She then collaborated with Maktub on the single "Marry You".

Yoo released two soundtracks for television series in 2018, "Your Name Is..." and "Stay With You" for The Undateables and Where Stars Land respectively. "Tell Me, Please" was released as the second part of the soundtrack of Melting Me Softly on October 14, 2019. Yoo also made her acting debut, making a cameo in A Korean Odyssey.

In September 2019, Yoo participated in the survival program show, V-1, to select the Vocal Queen among the various girl group members, where only the top 12 girl group members in votes would progress and perform on the show. Yoo eventually won the competition after defeating Dreamcatcher's Siyeon in the finals.

In September 2020, Yoo participated in MBN's Lotto Singer. She released "Spider Lily" on October 31, 2020, as part of the soundtrack of More Than Friends.

On May 4, 2021, Yoo and the members of I.O.I celebrated their 5th debut anniversary with a reunion live stream show called "Yes, I Love It!".

Yoo together with Dawon participated in Immortal Songs: Singing the Legend. They performed with Xitsuh and Koo Jun-yup and eventually became the final winner. On August 10, Yoo and Dawon released a cover song of Taeyeon's "Starlight" for NORAE-ing LIVE of Time. The pair went on to make an appearance on Jo Se-ho's Jo Se-ho's Wine Bar. Yoo collaborated with MJ of Sunny Side on the track "Guardian Angel", which was released on October 31, 2021.

2022–present: Musical debut
Yoo, together with Seola, released a soundtrack "100 percent" in January 2022, as part of the soundtrack of Best Mistake 3. She is also set to make her musical debut as the female lead in Lizzie on March 24, 2022.later, in July 2022, Yoo joined the stage play Crash Landing on You, an adaptation of the television series. Yoo will be playing the role of Seo Dan, the original role of Seo Ji-hye in the TV drama version.

Discography

As lead artist

As featured artist

Collaborations

Soundtrack appearances

Filmography

Television series

Television shows

Theatre

Awards and nominations

Notes

References

External links

 

1999 births
Living people
People from Gwangmyeong
Swing Entertainment artists
Mandarin-language singers of South Korea
Starship Entertainment artists
South Korean female idols
South Korean women pop singers
Produce 101 contestants
Cosmic Girls members
I.O.I members
21st-century South Korean women singers
21st-century South Korean singers
South Korean musical theatre actresses
Hanlim Multi Art School alumni